U.S. Route 36 (US 36) is a United States highway that travels from Rocky Mountain National Park, Colorado to Uhrichsville, Ohio. In Colorado, the highway traverses an east–west route mostly in the northern portion of the Great Plains. At its west end, the road connects several small mountain towns such as Estes Park and Lyons to the larger metropolitan areas of Boulder and Denver. As it continues eastward, it connects to several other small towns and rural highways on the plains before crossing the state line into Kansas.

Route description

Rocky Mountain National Park to Boulder
 US 36 begins at Deer Ridge Junction in Rocky Mountain National Park, where it intersects US 34 (Trail Ridge Road) on the eastern slope of the Rocky Mountains. It exits the park at the Beaver Meadows Visitor Center and enters the town of Estes Park, where it is briefly overlapped with US 34 Business until it meets (but does not cross) the main US 34 again at an intersection shaped like the letter K. On its way out of Estes Park it intersects SH 7 at South St. Vrain Avenue, for the first of three times.

It then descends southeast through North St. Vrain Canyon to the town of Lyons, which it enters on Main Street. At 5th Avenue in Lyons, it intersects SH 7 again, beginning an overlap to Boulder which is signed only as US 36. At 5th Avenue and Main Street in Lyons, it divides into a pair of one-way streets with the eastbound direction traveling one block south on 5th Avenue and turning east onto Broadway Street, and the westbound direction using Main Street. The two directions reunite in two blocks and leave Lyons southeastward as four-lane Ute Highway. Just outside Lyons, US 36 turns south at a signalized intersection onto two-lane North Foothills Highway, while SH 66 continues east to Longmont. From Lyons to Boulder, US 36 pretty much traces the edge of the foothills.

US 36 enters Boulder on four-lane-wide 28th Street, where it serves the city's main shopping area. On the north side of Boulder, it intersects SH 119 at Diagonal Highway, beginning a 1.4 mile overlap that extends until SH 119 turns west onto Canyon Boulevard towards Nederland. One block farther south, SH 7 diverges from its overlap with US 36 by turning east onto Arapahoe Avenue. Leaving the Boulder shopping district, US 36 crosses Boulder Creek and passes through the University of Colorado campus area as an expressway to the interchange with Baseline Road, where it meets Spur US 36, a two-block long connector along 27th Way to SH 93, signed only as "To SH 93" and "To US 36".

Boulder to Denver
Just after the Baseline Road interchange, US 36 changes to a southeasterly direction, using the route of the original Denver-Boulder Turnpike, a toll road from its opening in 1952 until 1967. The road intersects SH 157 (Foothills Parkway) on its way out of Boulder. Northwestbound traffic approaching Boulder on the turnpike can stop at the Davidson Mesa Overlook, a scenic overlook providing a panoramic view of the Front Range mountains, the City of Boulder, and its famous Flatirons rock formation; a monument to the Denver-Boulder Turnpike's original builders is also located here. Continuing southeast, the road enters the fast-growing Denver suburbs of Broomfield and Westminster, which have become popular locations for High-Tech businesses, which can be seen lining the turnpike. An interchange at 96th Street provides access to the Northwest Parkway and thereby to the E-470 outer beltway around Denver. At an interchange with SH 121 and SH 128 in Broomfield, it meets (but does not cross) US 287. It then has another interchange with US 287 again at Federal Boulevard near 76th Avenue in Westminster. The interchange at 76th and Federal was the terminus of the original Denver-Boulder Turnpike when it was still a toll road, but in common parlance the Denver-Boulder Turnpike now extends all the way east to I-25. 

The US 36 bikeway, part of the multi-modal Fastracks US 36 Express Lanes Project, mostly parallels the road between Table Mesa Drive in Boulder and 80th Avenue in Westminster, the first 11-mile stretch between Westminster and Louisville/Superior opening on Bike-to-Work Day in June 2015, the full route to Table Mesa in Boulder in March 2016.

Denver to Byers (unsigned)
At the very complicated junction of US 36, I-25, I-76, and I-270, US 36 emerges overlapped and unsigned with I-270, and continues overlapped and unsigned with I-70 when I-270 ends near the former Stapleton Airport site. At Colfax Avenue, this I-70/US 36 overlap is also joined by US 287 (the third time the two highways come into proximity) and US 40. From the interchange with Colfax Avenue, the road continues to Watkins and then to Byers, unsigned in its four-way overlap with I-70, US 40, and US 287.

Byers to Kansas state line
At Byers, US 36 heads eastward on its own as a separate rural highway, while the I-70/US 40/US 287 overlap curves to the southeast. US 36 passes through several very small settlements including Last Chance, Lindon, Anton, and Cope in Washington County and Joes and Idalia in Yuma County. Many of the towns on this desolate  section of highway are so small they do not provide basic traveler services such as gasoline, and winter drivers are cautioned by signs that there is no snowplowing at night.

Tolls

Denver-Boulder Turnpike
The Denver-Boulder Turnpike was championed by business and university interests in Boulder due to there being no direct route between Denver and Boulder. The  toll road stretched from Federal Boulevard (US 287) in Westminster to Baseline Road in Boulder, and opened on January 19, 1952 with a toll of $0.25. The Valley Highway from downtown Denver opened in 1952–1954, feeding directly into the Turnpike. Most of the new highway carried SH 185 (US 87), but traffic continuing north on that route initially had to exit at 70th Avenue, now SH 224, with the remainder of the route to Federal Boulevard becoming a realignment of SH 382. When the bonds for the Turnpike were paid off ahead of time in 1967, tolls were removed.

Express lanes

Beginning in July 2012, the Colorado Department of Transportation built a high-occupancy toll lane (HOT lane) in each direction between Federal Boulevard and 88th Street in Louisville, Colorado. Phase 1 of the project, costing $497 million, will open in summer 2015. High-occupancy vehicles and buses like RTD's Flatiron Flyer travel free in the HOT lanes, while single-occupancy vehicles must pay between $1.25 to $7.60, depending on time of day, or up to $13.68 without an electronic toll collection pass. To accommodate the lanes, several bridges were replaced and shoulders were widened along the highway. Phase 2 of the project, anticipated to be complete by early 2016, will extend the HOT lanes from 88th Street to Table Mesa Drive in Boulder, Colorado, through a public–private partnership.

History

The road from Strasburg east to the Kansas state line was added to the state highway system in 1922 as the Colorado part of a proposed "Kansas City-Denver Airline Highway" that would have cut  from the existing highways between Denver and Kansas City. The planned route followed present U.S. Route 36 in Kansas to Mankato, but then turned southeasterly via Concordia and Clay Center to Manhattan, where it met the Victory Highway (now US 24 and US 40). The new state highway was assigned the Primary Road No. 102 designation, and kept its number when many others were changed in 1923.

The west end of State Highway 102 was initially at Strasburg, but by 1924 it had been shifted to Byers, using the present County Roads 10 and 197 to return to current US 36. In 1927–1929 the entire SH 102 became part of US 36, which was realigned to go west rather than southwest from Norton, Kansas. The west end was moved back to Strasburg in 1932–1934, and a number of right-angle turns were eliminated by constructing diagonal cutoffs west of Cope and at the state line in 1934–1935. US 36 was extended west in 1936–1937 as an overlap with US 40 on Colfax Avenue to downtown Denver, where it would end for the next 30 years. Paving began in 1937–1939 and was completed in 1947–1949, including a realignment off County Roads DD and 12 north of Idalia. The junction with US 40 near Strasburg-Byers was changed again in 1954–1955, now following County Road 181 east of Byers. Finally in 1958–1959 a realignment west of Idalia eliminated four more 90-degree turns.

When the tolls were removed from the Denver-Boulder Turnpike, the road became State Highway 49, which also replaced all of SH 382. US 36 was also extended at this time, following the Valley Highway (by then part of I-25) from Colfax Avenue north to SH 49, and then overlapping SH 49 to the end at Baseline Road, SH 119 on 28th Street, SH 7 to Lyons, and SH 66 to end at US 34 in Estes Park. Late in 1968 these redundant state highway designations were dropped, resulting in the elimination of SH 49 and SH 102, realignment of SH 119 to go more directly in Boulder, and creation of gaps on SH 7 and SH 66. In 2012, the turnpike was also given the honorary name Buffalo Highway in recognition of the University of Colorado's mascot, though this name has not achieved common use.

Returning to Colfax Avenue east of Denver, the first part of I-70 in that area opened in 1961–1962, bypassing Watkins and Bennett and carrying US 36 (and US 40/US 287). The freeway was extended east past Strasburg and Byers in 1963–1964, including the final realignment of US 36 northeast of Byers. The old alignment was initially removed from the state highway system, but in 1964–1965 it returned as part of SH 8. When this route was largely eliminated in late 1968, this bypassed highway instead became State Highway 36 (and SH 40 east of Byers), with US 36 remaining on I-70. US 36 was realigned through Denver in 1970, following I-70 and I-270 north of downtown. (Note that, until 2000, I-270 ended at I-76, and US 36 traffic had to use short pieces of I-76 and I-25.) A final westerly extension came in 1977–1978, when US 36 replaced the western segment of SH 66 (except for a spur) from Estes Park into Rocky Mountain National Park and another junction with US 34.

In early September 2013, a  section of US 36 from Estes Park to Boulder was closed due to damage from the 2013 Colorado floods. For a time, the only route available in and out of Estes Park was a long detour through Nederland, Blackhawk, and Golden. The section in North St. Vrain Canyon west of Lyons was especially heavily damaged. The road was finally reopened two months later with the help of the National Guard. Permanent repairs were started in January, 2014.

In July 2019, cracks appeared on the eastbound lanes of the highway in Westminster due to shifting soil underneath. The highway has been closed as construction crews try to address the problem.

Major junctions
The mileposts in Larimer County temporarily reset at the concurrency with US 34.

Colorado State Highway 36

SH 36 is the stretch of former US 36 that runs from Aurora to Byers. Its western terminus is at exit 292 of I-70. Form there, it goes east through Watkins, Bennett, and Strasburg, meeting I-70 twice along the way before meeting I-70 for a third time at its eastern terminus (exit 316). This first junction with I-70 east of Aurora is in Bennett, at exit 306. The second such junction is at an underpass near Strasburg, with no access to or from the Interstate.

The highway was originally signed as part of SH 8.

Major intersections
Mileposts are based on US 36 mileage.

References

External links

Colorado Highways: US 36
Historic west endpoints of US Highway 36
US 36 Express Lanes - CDOT

Eastern Plains
Transportation in Larimer County, Colorado
Transportation in Boulder County, Colorado
Transportation in Broomfield, Colorado
Transportation in Denver
Transportation in Jefferson County, Colorado
Transportation in Adams County, Colorado
Transportation in Arapahoe County, Colorado
Transportation in Washington County, Colorado
Transportation in Yuma County, Colorado
36
 Colorado